Aira elegans is a species of plant in the Poaceae family. It is commonly known as Mediterranean hairgrass, elegant hairgrass and the annual silver hairgrass.

References 

Flora of Malta
Pooideae